Alec Tyler Lemon (born July 1, 1991) is a former American football wide receiver. He played college football for the Syracuse Orange and was signed as an undrafted free agent by the Houston Texans in 2013.

Early life and high school career
Lemon attended Arundel Senior High School in Gambrills, Maryland where he played both offense and defense. He set the record for the most receiving yards his senior year with a total of 1,616, while tying the records for touchdowns (23) and receptions (103). He also added 30 tackles, 6 interceptions, and 2 forced fumbles while on the defensive side of the ball.

Lemon was also known for playing baseball during high school and recognized as someone who helped the local community as a volunteer for the Arundel School Mentoring Program. As a senior, he was team captain and a first-team all-state selection by the Associated Press for football.

College career
Lemon attended Syracuse University where he played wide receiver. His senior year, he caught 73 passes for 1,074 yards including 7 touchdowns. This earned him an All-Big East Conference selection. This followed up on his junior year where he caught 69 passes for 834 yards and second-team All-Big East honors. His senior year, he also became the all-time leader in pass receptions for the Orangemen, a title previously held by Rob Moore.

Lemon played in the 2013 Senior Bowl prior to working out with other NFL prospects at the NFL Combine.

Professional career

References

External links
Syracuse Orange bio

1991 births
Living people
American football wide receivers
Canadian football wide receivers
American players of Canadian football
Syracuse Orange football players
Houston Texans players
Saskatchewan Roughriders players
People from Aurora, Colorado
People from Gambrills, Maryland